The 2019 Ulster Senior Club Football Championship was the 52nd instalment of the annual competition organised by Ulster GAA. It was one of the four provincial competitions of the 2019–20 All-Ireland Senior Club Football Championship.

Gaoth Dobhair from Donegal were the 2018 champions following their victory in the final over Monaghan's Scotstown. They didn't get to defend the title after losing the Donegal county final to Naomh Conaill.

Down kings Kilcoo were crowned Ulster champions for the first time, defeating Naomh Conaill in the final.

Teams
The Ulster championship is contested by the winners of the nine county championships in the Irish province of Ulster. Ulster comprises the six counties of Northern Ireland, as well as Cavan, Donegal and Monaghan in the Republic of Ireland.

Bracket

Preliminary round

Quarter-finals

Semi-finals

Final

Championship statistics

Top scorers
Overall

In a single game

References

Ulster Senior Club Football Championship
2019 in Northern Ireland sport
Ulster Senior Club Championship
Ulster Club SFC